Egnar is an unincorporated community in San Miguel County, Colorado, United States. Egnar has a U.S. Post Office with the ZIP Code 81325.

Description
A post office called Egnar has been in operation since 1917. The community's name is "Range" spelled backward.

See also

 List of geographic names derived from anagrams and ananyms

References

External links

Unincorporated communities in San Miguel County, Colorado
Unincorporated communities in Colorado